César Valenzuela Maass (born 5 January 1989) is a Chilean lawyer who was elected as a member of the Chilean Constitutional Convention.

He was a leader in the 2006 student protests in Chile.

In September 2021, he was a positive case of COVID-19.

References

External links
 

Living people
1989 births
21st-century Chilean politicians
Members of the Chilean Constitutional Convention
Alberto Hurtado University alumni
People from Santiago Province, Chile